Ombrea is a monotypic moth genus of the family Erebidae. Its only species, Ombrea aenochromoides, is found in Sumatra. Both the genus and species were first described by Francis Walker in 1865.

References

Calpinae
Monotypic moth genera